The 1966 Stanford Indians football team represented Stanford University during the 1966 NCAA University Division football season.

Season
The Indians were coached by John Ralston in his fourth season. The team was 4–1 outside their conference, but won only one conference game, defeating rival California for the sixth straight season, establishing the longest winning streak by one team in the Big Game until the 2001 Stanford team surpassed the record.

Schedule

Players drafted by the NFL

References

Stanford
Stanford Cardinal football seasons
Stanford Indians football